Leonel Martínez (born 18 September 1963) is a Venezuelan sports shooter. He competed in the mixed trap event at the 1984 Summer Olympics.

References

1963 births
Living people
Venezuelan male sport shooters
Olympic shooters of Venezuela
Shooters at the 1984 Summer Olympics
Place of birth missing (living people)
Pan American Games medalists in shooting
Pan American Games silver medalists for Venezuela
Shooters at the 1983 Pan American Games
Shooters at the 2015 Pan American Games
20th-century Venezuelan people
21st-century Venezuelan people